Come and Get It is a lost 1929 American silent action film directed by Wallace Fox and starring Bob Steele, James Quinn, and Betty Welsh. Shortly after the film's production, FBO was merged into the larger RKO Pictures.

The film was released in Britain by Ideal Films.

Cast 
 Bob Steele as Breezy Smith
 James Quinn as Buch Farrel
 Betty Welsh as Jane Elliott
 Jay Morley as Tout Regan
 James B. Leong as Singapore Joe
 Harry O'Connor as Breezy's father
 Marin Sais as Breezy's mother
 William Welsh as Judge Elliott

References

External links 
 
 

1929 films
1920s action films
American action films
Films directed by Wallace Fox
American silent feature films
1920s English-language films
Film Booking Offices of America films
Lost American films
American black-and-white films
1929 drama films
1920s American films